The 2009 UEFA European Under-21 Championship started on 31 May 2007 with a qualifying competition and finishes on 15 October 2008, before the final tournament on 15–23 June 2009. 51 of the 52 other nations in UEFA's jurisdiction, including Montenegro and Serbia who competed separately for the first time, went through a series of qualifiers to decide the seven other teams to join Sweden at the finals. Andorra did not take part.

The first stage of the qualifying competition is a group stage followed by play-offs. Each group winner, as well as the four highest ranked second place teams, will advance to the play-off. The play-off will determine which seven nations join Sweden in the final tournament. Sweden, as hosts, qualify automatically.

Groups

Summary
Teams that have secured a place in the play-offs are highlighted in green, in their respective qualifying groups. The teams are ordered by final group position.

Group 1

Group 2

Group 3

Group 4

Group 5

Group 6

Group 7

Group 8

Group 9

Group 10

Ranking of second-placed teams

(*) Since Group 1 had six teams, only results against the top five ranked teams are taken into account. As Azerbaijan finished last, Croatia's 3-2 and 1-0 wins are disregarded for the purpose of calculating best runners-up overall.

Play-offs

The play-off first legs were played on 10–11 October, while the second legs were played on 14–15 October.

|}

Top scorers

References

External links
Official site

 
Qualification
Qual
UEFA European Under-21 Championship qualification